Rei Sato may refer to:

, Japanese badminton player
, Japanese motorcycle racer